The 1962 United States Senate election in New York was held on November 6, 1962. Incumbent Republican U.S. Senator Jacob Javits won against Democratic challenger James B. Donovan.

Democratic nomination

Candidates
James B. Donovan, attorney and Vice Chair of the New York City Board of Education
Paul O'Dwyer, former member of the New York City Council

Convention
At the Democratic convention in Syracuse on September 18, Donovan defeated O'Dwyer. His nomination was the last of the night. His nomination, along with most others at the convention, was chiefly the result of a morning leadership conference of party leaders throughout the state.

Results

References

New York
1962
1962 New York (state) elections